Alaipayuthey is a 2017 Singaporean Tamil-language soap opera starring A. Panneeirchelvam, Puravalan Narayanasamy, Jenani, Jayaganesh,  Magalakshmi Sudarsanan, Brendon Kuah, Rubini and Vimala Velu. It aired every Monday through Thursday at 10:30PM (SST) on MediaCorp Vasantham from 16 January 2017 to 30 March 2017 for 43 episodes. It replaced Masala. The show's final one-hour episode aired Thursday 30 March 2017 at 10:00 PM SST.

Synopsis
The story revolves around Ratnam, his wife Malar and his three children, Haresh, Hashwini and Akshara, each having their own struggles in their life journey. Problems arise when Malar disapproves of Hashwini's boyfriend, Brandon due to his race. Knowing that the tension will soon potentially divide the family, Haresh agrees to marrying Kamini, his cousin. Meanwhile, Hashwini gets married without her mother's presence. Then, Ratnam meets his ex-girlfriend whom his father had rejected when he was younger. He finds out that she's working as a counselor in Askhara's university, and starts talking to her. Akshara too faces problems in university with her friends Prem, Kavin and Shwetha. She also finds out she has had brain tumor for some time already. Furthermore, Haresh falls in love with another girl, Shalini, and is stuck between Kamini and her. How all the characters deal with their own problems as a family, fight for their loves and learn lessons in the journey of life forms the rest of the plot for the story.

Cast

Main cast
 A. Panneeirchelvam
 Puravalan Narayanasamy
 Jaenani Netra
 Jaynesh
Magalakshmi Sudarsanan
 Brendon Kuah
 Rupini Anbalagan
 Vimala Velu

Supporting cast
 Laavenya
 Shawn Sathiya
 Dhurga
 Poovani
 Mohamed Anis
 Santhi
 Stephen Zecharaiah
 Saravanan
 Kartik
 Parathabini
 k. Dayanithi
 S. Mogene Priya
 Michale
 Andrew Thio 
 Sharon Tan

Production
The drama was written and directed by Haider Ali, Assistant director by Ganesh Murusamy, screenplay by Haider Ali and MD. Amin BMD Ali, Dialogue by MD. Amin BMD Ali and producer by Menaka Krishnasamy.

Original soundtrack

Title song
It was written by lyricist Parthiban and Seetharaman, composed Shabir  sung by Rita Thyagarajan and Shabir.

Soundtrack

Broadcast
Series was released on January 16, 2017, on Mediacorp Vasantham. It aired in Singapore and Malaysia on Mediacorp Vasantham, its full-length episodes and released its episodes on their app Toggle, a live TV feature was introduced on Toggle with English and Tamil subtitles.

References

External links 
 Vasantham Official Website
 Vasantham Facebook
 Alaipayuthey Serial Episode

Vasantham TV original programming
Tamil-language television shows in Singapore
Tamil-language romance television series
Singapore Tamil dramas
2010s Tamil-language television series
2017 Tamil-language television series debuts
2017 Tamil-language television series endings